Albert Harry “Albie” Reisz (November 29, 1917 – May 1, 1985) was a professional American football player who played quarterback for three seasons for the Cleveland / Los Angeles Rams.

1917 births
Players of American football from Ohio
American football quarterbacks
Cleveland Rams players
Los Angeles Rams players
Southeastern Louisiana Lions football players
1985 deaths